Giovanni Sgambati (28 May 1841 – 14 December 1914) was an Italian pianist and composer.

Biography 

Born in Rome, to an Italian father and an English mother, Sgambati, who lost his father early, received his early education at Trevi, in Umbria, where he wrote some church music and obtained experience as a singer and conductor. In 1860 he settled in Rome, and took up the work of winning acceptance for the best German music, then little known in Italy. The influence and support of Franz Liszt, who was in Rome from 1861, was naturally of great advantage to him, and concerts were given in which Sgambati conducted as well as played the piano.

His compositions at this period (1864–1865) included a quartet, two piano quintets, an octet, and an overture. He conducted Liszt's Dante Symphony on 26 February 1866 at the opening of the Sala di Dante at the Palazzo Poli, with 27 of Filippo Bigioli's paintings exhibited nearby. He made the acquaintance of Richard Wagner's music for the first time in Munich, whither he travelled in Liszt's company. His first album of songs appeared in 1870 (Schott Music), and his first symphony was played at the Palazzo del Quirinale in 1881; this, as well as a piano concerto, was performed in the course of his first visit to England in 1882; and at his second visit, in 1891, his Sinfonia epitalamio was given at the Philharmonic.

His most extensive work, a Requiem Mass, was performed in Rome 1901. His many pianoforte works have won permanent success. Sgambati was also active in the contemporary musical scene as a promoter of the music of others and, among these, Dante Alderighi. He conducted the Italian premieres of Beethoven's third and of seventh symphonies (in 1867 and 1870 respectively). He also conducted the Italian premieres of more recent works such as Liszt's Dante Symphony and Christus oratorio.

He died in Rome, aged 73. Notable students include pianist and composer Lucia Contini Anselmi and contralto Mary Augusta Wakefield.

See also
List of compositions by Giovanni Sgambati

Selected works

Orchestral

 Cola di Rienzo Overture (1866)
 Piano Concerto in G minor, Op. 15 (1878–1880)
 Symphony No. 1 in D major, Op. 16 (1880–1881)
 Symphony No. 2 in E-flat major (1883–1885)

Chamber music

 String Quartet in D minor (1864)
 Piano Quintet No. 1 in F minor, Op. 4 (1866)
 Piano Quintet No. 2 in B-flat, Op. 5
 String Quartet in C-sharp minor, Op. 17 (1882)
 Two Pieces for violin and piano, Op. 24 (1890)
 Gondoliera for violin and piano, Op. 29 (1894)

Piano

 Prélude et Fugue, Op. 6
 Deux Études de concert, Op. 10
 Fogli Volanti, Op. 12
 Gavotte in A-flat minor, Op.14 (1880)
 Quattro pezzi di seguito, Op. 18
 3 Notturni, Op.20 (B minor, G, C minor) (1873–87)
 Suite in B minor, Op. 21 (1888)
 Pièces Lyriques, Op. 23
 Mélodies poétiques, Op. 36
 Trois morceaux, Op. 42 (1909–10): No. 1. Prelude in c-sharp minor; No. 2. Berceuse-Rêverie in G-flat; No. 3. Melodia campestre (Impromptu) in F
 Étude triomphale in A, Op. posth.
 Sérénade valsée in A-flat, Op. posth.
 Melody from "Orfeo ed Euridice" (transcription for solo piano of "Dance of the Blessed Spirits" from Gluck's opera)

Sacred music
 Messa da Requiem, Op. 38 (1895–1901)

References

General references

Sources

External links
 
 

1841 births
1914 deaths
19th-century classical composers
19th-century classical pianists
19th-century conductors (music)
20th-century classical composers
20th-century classical pianists
20th-century Italian conductors (music)
20th-century Italian composers
20th-century Italian male musicians
Italian classical composers
Italian classical pianists
Italian male classical composers
Italian male conductors (music)
Italian male pianists
Italian people of English descent
Italian Romantic composers
Male classical pianists
Musicians from Rome
Pupils of Franz Liszt